The 2017 Seychelles First Division is the top level football competition in Seychelles. It started on 2 March 2017.

Standings

References

Football leagues in Seychelles
First Division
Seychelles